Tang Shengzhi (Wade-Giles: Tang Sheng-chih; 12 October 1889 – 6 April 1970) was a Chinese warlord during the Warlord Era, a military commander during the Second Sino-Japanese War and a politician after World War II. 

After participating in the Xinhai Revolution, Tang graduated from the Baoding Military Academy in 1914. He participated in the National Protection War and the Constitutional Protection Movement. Tang Shengzhi was appointed commander of the Hunan Fourth Division and came into conflict with the governor, Zhao Hengti. He was defeated and forced to withdraw from Changsha. He decided to join the Northern Expeditionary Army and was given command of the Eighth Army of the National Revolutionary Army. By 2 June 1926 his troops had reoccupied Changsha. On 11 March 1926 he became the military and civil governor of Hunan after the execution of the former provincial military commander, Li Youwen.  While his military office ended 14 July 1926 once his province had been secured, he remained as civil governor until April 1927. 

Tang sided with Chiang Kai-shek and helped him to secure control of northern Beijing and the Tianjin region by removing Bai Chongxi, a Guangxi warlord who was in actual control of the region but ostensibly allied with Chiang Kai-shek. Later Tang commanded armies to fight other warlords for Chiang Kai-shek with great success. However, after these potential rivals were defeated, Chiang enraged Tang when he attempted to remove him and as a result, Tang defected to warlords in Guangxi and Guangdong to help them fight Chiang.

During the Second Sino-Japanese War most warlords in China began to nominally unite against the Japanese invaders and Tang became an important member of Chiang Kai-shek's national defense committee. After repeated pleas from Chiang, Tang finally accepted the command of the Nanjing Garrison during the city's siege in December 1937 by the Japanese, and promised to fight the Japanese unto his death. There exists another claim. Some writers pointed out that it was Tang who volunteered to serve as the commander of the Nanjing garrison and promised to fight until his death without any pressure from Chiang Kai-Shek. Before 1937, Tang had served as a general under Chiang but without really much true power. It can be imagined that Chiang Kai-Shek appointed Tang as commander of the capital garrison only because there were not too many alternatives.

Plans for the defense of Nanjing 

Gen. Tang Shengzhi was now in charge of defending Nanjing against the Japanese attack. In a press release to foreign reporters, he announced the city would not surrender and would fight to the death. He gathered about 100,000 soldiers, mostly untrained and including a few defeated troops from the Shanghai battlefield, to defend the capital. He also placed the 35th and 72nd divisions at the port to prevent people from fleeing Nanjing, as instructed by Chiang Kai-shek's general headquarters at Wuhan. The defense force blocked roads, ruined boats and burned nearby villages, preventing many citizens from evacuating.

Battle of Nanjing 
By early December, Japanese troops had reached the outskirts of Nanking.

As events played out, the defense of Nanjing was not at all according to the plan formulated by Chiang and Tang. The defense plan fell apart from the very beginning because the defenders were overwhelmed by Chinese troops fleeing from battles in the area surrounding Nanking. They just wanted to escape to safer ground and, in their panic, discipline had broken down to the point that units were refusing to obey any orders. In some cases,  regimental commanders of units defending the capital were shot and killed by the company commanders of units in flight simply because the regimental commanders refused to move out of the way so that the fleeing units would have a more direct route to escape from the Japanese.
Chiang Kai-shek, who had already left for Wuhan, granted Tang the right to shoot anyone who disobeyed his order on the spot, but Tang could not carry out the order because there were hundreds of thousands of troops in open flight. To carry out Chiang's directive, Tang would have had to have the Nanking Garrison wage battle against the fleeing Nationalist troops before facing the Japanese assault on the city.

As it became obvious that the plan was falling apart because of the total collapse of discipline among the troops in flight, Tang realized the city could not be defended. Given the grim circumstances, Chiang's staff and even Chiang himself had resigned themselves to this reality. However, Chiang was extremely reluctant to give up the capital without a fight, and nobody else would dare to make such a decision and face the angry Chinese public.

At the same time, Chiang was also extremely grateful to Tang for assuming command of the Nanking Garrison and thus allowing Chiang to avoid the dilemma posed by the situation. He ordered Tang to continue the hopeless fight long enough to save face, and then he would have the prerogative to decide to withdraw. Tang was now in the very difficult position of trying to conduct a defense that he knew was futile would be abandoned in the near future. The tension was palpably obvious at a press conference Tang held to boost morale prior to the siege of Nanking. It was noted by reporters that Tang was extremely agitated and that he sweated so profusely that someone handed him a hot towel to dry his brow.

While the Japanese army was dropping leaflets ordering the city to capitulate, Tang had publicly expressed his outrage. Privately, however, he negotiated for a truce. Despite his original promise to fight to the last man, he seemed eager to do anything to avoid a showdown in the city to save the capital and its inhabitants. At the same time, he also had to carry on the hopeless symbolic fight to defend the capital for the Chinese government to face the Chinese public.

The decision to order a general retreat 
Once the news reached Tang's headquarters that several units had abandoned their positions and fled against orders, it became obvious that a general retreat was inevitable. The problem was that whoever gave the order to retreat would be blamed for losing the capital and face a very angry Chinese public, Tang was very reluctant to take the responsibility and the consequent blame alone and so he called a meeting that included every divisional commander and those of higher rank and showed them Chiang Kai-shek's permission to retreat when needed, a decision to be made by Tang's headquarters. As Tang asked everyone's opinion and got the answer that he wanted, which was unanimously agreeing to retreat, he had everyone sign their names on Chiang's order before he gave out the general retreat order. 

On December 12, after two days of defending against an enemy with overwhelming numerical superiority, which was shelling the city with heavy artillery fire and aerial bombardment, and with many of his troops in open flight, Tang ordered a general retreat. That evening, he himself escaped from the city through the Yijiang Gate on the northern side of the city walls, the only gate still available as an escape route at the time, without officially announcing to the Japanese military authorities any intention of surrendering the city.

The general retreat turns into a rout 
However, just as the defensive battle had not played out according to the plan, the general retreat was not conducted as planned. What ensued was nothing short of chaos, and what was supposed to be an organized retreat rapidly turned into a chaotic and panicked flight.

By late evening, the unorganized retreat had become a complete rout. Many commanders simply abandoned their troops and fled on their own without giving any orders to retreat. Of the 100,000 defenders of the capital and thousands more Chinese troops fleeing back to the capital from the battles in the areas around Nanking, only two regiments managed to successfully retreat according to the original plan, and both survived intact. Other units that did not retreat according to the original plan fell victim to the attacking Japanese forces.   

Frank Tillman Durdin of the New York Times and Archibald Steele of the Chicago Daily News wrote of the Chinese troops looting shops for food and removing their uniforms for civilian clothing, "Streets became covered with guns, grenades, swords, knapsacks, coats, shoes, and helmets."

Life after Nanjing 
Despite Chiang Kai-shek's support and protection, Tang was blamed for the failure that resulted in the consequent Nanjing Massacre. He lived a more or less retired life and devoted his time to studying Buddhism.

After World War II he was not noticed until the fall of the Kuomintang regime, when Bai Chongxi asked Tang to go with him as the Nationalist force withdrew further south. Tang refused to flee China, disguising himself and hiding in different places to avoid being captured by the Nationalist forces, breaking one of his legs in the process.  He became a commander and governor in Hunan after 1949.

Career 
1926  Military–Governor of Hunan Province
1926–1927 Governor of Hunan Province
1929 General Officer Commanding 5th Army
1932–1934 President of the Military Advisory Council
1934–1937 Director–General of Military Training
1937 General Officer Commanding Nanking Garrison Command
1945 Member of the Military Affairs Commission

References 

Iris Chang. The Rape of Nanking: The Forgotten Holocaust of World War II (Basic Books, 1997)

External links
 The Generals of WWII; Generals from China; Tang Shengzhi with photo

National Revolutionary Army generals from Hunan
People's Republic of China politicians from Hunan
Chinese military personnel of World War II
Republic of China Buddhists
People's Republic of China Buddhists
1889 births
1970 deaths
Recipients of the Order of Blue Sky and White Sun
Politicians from Yongzhou
 19th-century Chinese people
 20th-century Chinese people
People of the Northern Expedition
Governors of Hunan